Lophocnema is a genus of moths in the family Sesiidae.

Species
Lophocnema eusphyra  Turner, 1917

References

Sesiidae
Moth genera
Taxa named by Alfred Jefferis Turner